A collectable (collectible or collector's item) is any object regarded as being of value or interest to a collector. Collectable items are not necessarily monetarily valuable or uncommon. There are numerous types of collectables and terms to denote those types. An antique is a collectable that is old. A curio is a small, usually fascinating or unusual item sought by collectors. A manufactured collectable is an item made specifically for people to collect.

The business of collectables

Created to be collected 
A "manufactured" collectable (often referred to as a contemporary collectable) is an item made specifically for people to collect. Examples of items commonly sold as collectables include plates, figurines, bells, graphics, steins, and dolls. Some companies that produce manufactured collectables are members of The Gift and Collectibles Guild.

Special editions, limited editions and variants on these terms fall under the category of manufactured collectables and are used as a marketing incentive for various types of product. They were originally applied to products related to the arts—such as books, prints or recorded music and films—but are now used for cars, fine wine and many other collectables. A special edition typically includes extra material of some kind. A limited edition is restricted in the number of copies produced, although the number may be arbitrarily high.

Collectables in commerce 
Manufacturers and retailers have used collectables in a number of ways to increase sales. One use is in the form of licensed collectables based on intellectual properties, such as images, characters and logos from literature, music, movies, radio, television, and video games. A large subsection of licensing includes advertising, brandname, and character collectibles. Another use of collectables in retail is in the form of prizes (items of nominal value packaged with or included in the price of a retail product at no additional cost) and premiums (items that can be "purchased" by redeeming coupons, boxtops, or proofs of purchase from the product along with a small fee to cover shipping and handling). Also, collectables have played an important role in tourism, in the form of souvenirs. Another important field of collecting that is also big business is memorabilia, which includes collectables related to a person, organization, event or media, including T-shirts, posters, and numerous other collectables marketed to fans; but also includes ephemera from historical, media, or entertainment events, items that were meant to be thrown away but were saved by fans and accumulated by collectors. Collectibles have become a huge market globally coupled with the astonishing rise in application of Non Fungible Tokens (NFT) which are now used as a medium for digital collectibles sales. The collectibles market size in 2020 was estimated at $372 billion (Collectibles Market Report). Further, the market holds huge opportunity with a Total Addressable Market (TAM) of around $440 Billion in 2020. Digital collectibles may become a reliable revenue stream for creators as NFTs evolve and spread.

Collectables as investments 
Collectables are items of limited supply that are sought for a variety of reasons including a possible increase in value. In a financial sense, collectables can be viewed as a hedge against inflation. Over time, their value can also increase as they become more rare due to loss, damage or destruction. One drawback to investing in collectables is the potential lack of liquidity, particularly for very obscure items. There is also a risk for fraud.

The 1960s through the early 1990s were major years for the manufacturing of contemporary collectables. While some individuals purchased contemporary collectables to enjoy and use, many purchased them as investments. Speculative markets developed for many of these pieces. Because so many people bought for investment purposes, duplicates are common. And although many collectables were labeled as "limited editions", the actual number of items produced was very large. Consequently, there is very little demand for many (but not all) items produced during this time period, and their market values are often low.

Digital collecting 

Digital collecting takes place in the blockchain, and it got popular at the end of 2020 with the  NFT craze of 2020-2021. Collectors can buy, trade and exchange digital items (NFTs) usually associated with images or artworks. These items are usually bought using cryptocurrency, although many marketplaces have made it possible to purchase NFTs using standard credit cards as well. Just like in physical collecting, items can hold value due to different reasons, but they are not necessarily monetarily valuable, rare, uncommon or aesthetically pleasing. The Curio Cards, the Rare Pepe or the CryptoPunks are amongst the first cases of digital collectibles. Digital collecting also applies to  digital artworks.

History
The urge to collect unusual and fascinating objects is primeval and not limited to humans (bowerbird, pack rat).

The Renaissance Cabinet of Curiosities was an antecedent both of modern museums and modern collecting.

The earliest manufactured collectables were included as incentives with other products, such as cigarette cards in packs of cigarettes. Popular items developed a secondary market and sometimes became the subject of "collectable crazes". Eventually many collectable items came to be sold separately, instead of being used as marketing tools to increase the appeal of other products.

To encourage collecting, manufacturers often create an entire series of a given collectable, with each item differentiated in some fashion. Examples include sports cards depicting individual players, or different designs of Beanie Babies. Enthusiasts will often try to assemble a complete set of the available variations.

Collector editions are another way of supporting collectables. They typically are produced in limited amount and contain additional content that can be valuable for a collector. This practice is mostly popular in video games.

Early versions of a product, manufactured in smaller quantities before its popularity as a collectable developed, sometimes command exorbitant premiums on the secondary market. Dolls and other toys made during an adult collector's childhood can command such premiums. Unless extremely rare or made as a one-of-a-kind in a mature market, collectables rarely prove to be a spectacular investment.

See also 
 Collectible market index
 Coin collecting
 Stamp collecting

References

External links

 Collecting: A Rationale
 Collectibles Market Analysis

Collecting